Dallas C. Carter (February 14, 1888 – April 20, 1942) was an American Negro league infielder in the 1910s.

A native of Louisville, Kentucky, Carter played for the New York Black Sox in 1910, and for the Louisville White Sox in 1914. He died in Chicago, Illinois in 1942 at age 54.

References

External links
Baseball statistics and player information from Baseball-Reference Black Baseball Stats and Seamheads

1888 births
1942 deaths
Louisville White Sox players
Baseball infielders
Baseball players from Louisville, Kentucky